is a Japanese businessman and gaming industry veteran. He was the President of SIE Worldwide Studios for Sony Interactive Entertainment from 2008 to 2019, before moving onto other SIE-related projects. Yoshida has been a key member of the PlayStation brand since its original concept, having been part of the company since 1993.

Sony Interactive Entertainment 
He graduated with a Bachelor of Science degree from the Faculty of Economics at Kyoto University, where he was involved in the corporate strategy group, as well as coordinating the PC business. Yoshida joined Sony Corporation in April 1986.

He later earned his MBA degree at University of California, Los Angeles (UCLA) in 1993.

He was one of the initial members of the PlayStation project in February 1993, where as the lead account executive he headed Sony Computer Entertainment Inc.'s third party licensing program..

Yoshida has many best-selling titles under his belt, including SCEA's premier online game with voice-enabled headset SOCOM U.S. Navy SEALs, as well as Jak and Daxter, Twisted Metal: Black, and ATV Offroad Fury. In the studio, Yoshida was executive producer for titles including Gran Turismo, Ape Escape, The Legend of Dragoon, and other titles.

In April 2000, he became the Vice President at Sony Computer Entertainment America. In February 2007, he became Senior Vice President at SCE Worldwide Studios USA. In May 2008, he became the President of SCE Worldwide Studios.

In November 2013 Yoshida appeared in the official PlayStation 4 unboxing video.

In 2013, Yoshida gained significant popularity due to his largely increased openness, presence with consumers, and the gaming industry around the announcement and the launch of the PlayStation 4. This was mainly achieved by breaking news and frequently answering questions from consumers via his Twitter account, appearing as a guest on various gaming podcasts, and being featured in official PlayStation videos among other things.

On 7 November 2019, Sony announced that Yoshida had stepped down as President of SIE Worldwide Studios amid a company reshuffle to become head of a newly formed initiative that will focus on nurturing external independent creators. The new initiative will focus on supporting external developers that are creating 'new and unexpected' experiences for the gaming industry. He was replaced by Hermen Hulst, the former studio head of Guerrilla Games.

References

External links
 SIE Worldwide Studios homepage

1964 births
Corporate executives
Japanese video game businesspeople
Kyoto University alumni
Living people
Businesspeople from Tokyo
UCLA Anderson School of Management alumni
Sony Interactive Entertainment people